Amaurornis is a genus of birds in the rail family Rallidae. The species in this genus are typically called bush-hens. A monotypic subtribe, Amaurornithina, was proposed for this genus.

Taxonomy
The genus Amaurornis was erected by the German naturalist Ludwig Reichenbach in 1853 with the plain bush-hen (Amaurornis olivacea) as the type species.   The name comes from the Greek amauros, meaning "dusky" or "brown" and ornis, meaning "bird".

The New Guinea flightless rail was sometimes included in this genus, but more often held to constitute a distinct monotypic genus Megacrex. The first cladistic studies of rails, based on morphology, strongly suggested that Amaurornis as traditionally defined is not monophyletic, and that several species placed here are in fact closer to the small crakes traditionally placed in Porzana. This was subsequently confirmed by molecular data. However, these smallish species are probably not close to the large members of Porzana either, and would warrant re-establishment of the old genus Zapornia.

Species
The genus contains five species:

References

 
Bird genera
Rallidae
Taxonomy articles created by Polbot
Taxa named by Ludwig Reichenbach